Zora dubrovačka (Dawn of Dubrovnik) is a Croatian telenovela produced by Nova TV. It is an original story, produced in 2013, and starring Barbara Bilić, Boris Ler and Vanessa Radman.
 
The series, set during the 1991-92 Siege of Dubrovnik, was immediately met with negative reception in the city itself. Viewers called Zora dubrovačka a "disgraceful catastrophe", claiming that it inaccurately portrays Dubrovnik, its people and the local accent.

Cast

References

External links

2013 Croatian television series debuts
2013 telenovelas
Croatian television series
2010s Croatian television series
Dubrovnik in fiction
Nova TV (Croatia) original programming